Darzalas Peak is the rocky, mostly ice-free peak rising to 934 m in the south foothills of Detroit Plateau on Nordenskjöld Coast in Graham Land, Antarctica.  The peak is situated between Bombardier and Dinsmoor Glaciers, and surmounting Mundraga Bay to the southeast.

The peak is named after the Thracian god Darzalas.

Location
British mapping in 1978.

Maps
 British Antarctic Territory.  Scale 1:200000 topographic map.  DOS 610 Series, Sheet W 64 60.  Directorate of Overseas Surveys, UK, 1978.
 Antarctic Digital Database (ADD). Scale 1:250000 topographic map of Antarctica. Scientific Committee on Antarctic Research (SCAR), 1993–2016.

Notes

References
 Darzalas Peak. SCAR Composite Antarctic Gazetteer.
 Bulgarian Antarctic Gazetteer. Antarctic Place-names Commission. (details in Bulgarian, basic data in English)

External links
 Darzalas Peak. Copernix satellite image

Mountains of Graham Land
Bulgaria and the Antarctic
Nordenskjöld Coast